Omar Alejandro Walcott Roberts (born 24 July 1965) is a Venezuelan former basketball player who competed in the 1992 Summer Olympics.

References

External links
 RealGM profile

1965 births
Living people
Basketball players at the 1992 Summer Olympics
Cocodrilos de Caracas players
Gaiteros del Zulia players
Guaiqueríes de Margarita players
Liga ACB players
Marinos B.B.C. players
Olympic basketball players of Venezuela
Saski Baskonia players
Venezuelan expatriate basketball people in Portugal
Venezuelan expatriate basketball people in Spain
Venezuelan expatriate basketball people in the United States
Venezuelan men's basketball players